Ajegunle, popularly known as "AJ City" or simply "AJ", is a neighbourhood located in the heart of Lagos, Lagos State, Nigeria. It is located in the Ajeromi-Ifelodun local government area of Lagos. Ajegunle in the Yoruba language means "A place where riches dwells."

It is bordered on the west by Apapa Wharf and Tincan, two of Nigeria's biggest sea ports through which over 70 percent of imported goods come into the country. Ajegunle has a population of about 550,000 residents from many of the ethnic groups in Nigeria.

The community was subject to the Ijaw/Ilaje conflict that became an inspiration for the album CRISIS, released in 2007 by African China.

Notable residents
It has produced notable footballers and musicians, including Samson Siasia, former coach of the Nigeria national team, Biodun Upe Obende, who plays in Finland, former Manchester United striker Odion Ighalo, former Super Eagles defender Taribo West, Chinwendu Ihezuo of the Nigeria women's national team, and Emmanuel Amuneke, former African Footballer of the Year.
Ajegunle was brought to limelight by the popular musician Daddy Showkey in the late 1990s.

References 

Neighborhoods of Lagos
Slums in Nigeria